John Terrence Slattery (January 6, 1878 – July 17, 1949) was a catcher and first baseman for the Boston Americans, Cleveland Naps, Chicago White Sox, St. Louis Cardinals, and the Washington Senators for parts of four seasons between 1901 and 1909.  He was never used regularly, and some of his Major League stops were very short (he played only four games for the Naps).  He went to college at Boston College and Fordham University. He was head baseball coach at Harvard from 1920 to 1923 and Boston College from 1924 to 1927. In 1928, he was convinced to lead the Boston Braves for a year, but his stint with the Braves lasted only 31 games, going 11–20. He resigned as manager and owner Emil Fuchs hired Rogers Hornsby to replace him.

Slattery died in Boston, Massachusetts, at age 71.

References

External links

 

1878 births
1949 deaths
Boston Americans players
Cleveland Naps players
Chicago White Sox players
St. Louis Cardinals players
Washington Senators (1901–1960) players
Boston Braves managers
Fordham Rams baseball players
Boston College Eagles baseball coaches
Boston College Eagles baseball players
Harvard Crimson baseball coaches
Major League Baseball catchers
Toronto Maple Leafs (International League) players
New Bedford Whalers (baseball) players
New Bedford Browns players
Norwich Witches players
Amsterdam-Gloversville-Johnstown Jags players
Columbus Senators players
Milwaukee Brewers (minor league) players
Kansas City Blues (baseball) players
Johnstown Johnnies players
Sioux City Packers players
Oakland Oaks (baseball) players
Lawrence Colts players
Montreal Royals players
Baseball players from Massachusetts
Shamokin (minor league baseball) players